Whaddup A.. '?! is the second studio album by Indonesian singer Agnes Monica, released in 2005. The album got triple platinum with collaboration from American singer-songwriter, Keith Martin. This album shown the transformation from her 'teenage singer' persona, to a more mature concept. This album was also named as the best album of its era. It became her most experimental album, which included many genres, Pop, R&B, urban and dance-pop including pop rock and power ballad, also Eastern sounds. Despite having no album promotions in Malaysia, her album, Whaddup A’.. ?! was still a huge success which caused the album to be re-released with the new concept, and VCD bonus.

Singles

"Bukan Milikmu Lagi"
"Bukan Milikmu Lagi" (English: Not Yours Anymore) was the first single released off from the album. In this urban/dance-pop song, the singer angers her lover thus he is 'not hers anymore'. However she notices that the life will not end even the relationship has ended. The music video features Agnes and her dancers in a factory in a region called NEZville.

"Tanpa Kekasihku"
"Tanpa Kekasihku" (English: Without My Lover) was released as the second single from the album. The pop rock ballad was penned by Indonesian songwriter, Dewiq, in which its protagonist laments the death of her lover and says that life becomes useless without him. The music video features Agnes standing in a window of a building, seemingly intending to jump, with flashback scenes of her with her late love interest. The relationship is romantic, however Agnes is somehow disappointed with her lover and runs. Her lover follows her, accidentally they meet a villain in which her love is killed. Agnes laments the death of her boyfriend. In the end of the music video, however, Agnes does not jump from the building and goes back.

"Tak Ada Logika"
"Tak Ada Logika" (English: No Logic) is a dance pop song incorporating with R&B and Arabic music elements. The song was released as the third single, and instantly became a hit and one of her several signature songs. The song won multiple awards, most notably Anugerah Musik Indonesia, which it won in Best R&B Production for Solo, Duo, or Group category. Agnes hits A5 in full chest voice.

Accolades
At the 10th Annual Anugerah Musik Indonesia, the album and single subsequently earning most nominations with ten and winning four awards, including Best Pop Female Solo Artist for "Tanpa Kekasihku", Best R&B Production Work for "Bukan Milikmu Lagi", etc. and nominated for Best Pop Album and Best of the Best Album. A single "Tak Ada Logika" managing to earning a Most Favorite Female award and nominated for Best Video of the Year at the 2006 MTV Indonesia Awards.

Track listing

External links
 Whaddup A.. '?! by Agnes Monica on iTunes

Agnez Mo albums
2005 albums
Dance-pop albums by Indonesian artists
Albums produced by Keith Martin (musician)
Indonesian-language albums